Aluminium 7050 alloy is a heat treatable alloy. It has high toughness, high strength. It has high stress corrosion cracking resistance.  It has electric conductivity of value having 40 percent of copper.  7050 aluminium is known as a commercial aerospace alloy.

Chemical Composition

Physical Properties

Designations 
It can be written as: 

 AMS 4108
 AMS 4201
 ASTM B247
 ASTM B316
 QQ A-430

Welding 
Welding should be avoided, because it weakens aluminum alloy.

Applications 
 Aircraft and other structures
 Fuselage frames
 Bulkheads
 Wing skins
 Military aircraft applications

References

External links 
 For more properties, visit:  http://asm.matweb.com/search/SpecificMaterial.asp?bassnum=MA7050T765
 Aluminum 7050 properties for different thickness https://www.aircraftmaterials.com/data/aluminium/7050.html
 Characterization on Aluminum Alloy 7050 Metal Matrix Composite Reinforced with Graphene Nanoparticles, "S.Venkatesana", "M. Anthony", "Xaviorb"

Aluminum alloy table 

Aluminium–zinc alloys